Peak View Secondary School is a school in the Western Cape, South Africa.

References

Schools in Cape Town